The CIS national ice hockey team was an ephemeral national ice hockey team that represented the Commonwealth of Independent States. Essentially the former Soviet team under a different name, the CIS team existed in the few months between the dissolution of the Soviet Union and the formation of new ice hockey federations for the former Soviet states, now independent countries. Most notably, the team competed at the 1992 Winter Olympics as part of the Unified Team, winning the gold medal. However, the International Ice Hockey Federation would later attribute this gold medal to Russia as the successor state. The International Olympic Committee does not attribute that medal to Russia. After the Olympics, the CIS team ceased to exist and was replaced by the Russian team. In the 13 games the CIS played, they won 11 and lost 2.

History

The Soviet Union was dissolved in December 1991, only weeks before the start of the 1992 Winter Olympics in Albertville, France. As a result, there was no time to send a replacement for the Soviet national team, who was expected to compete at the Olympics. In effect, the Soviet team participated, under the name "Unified Team" and with the "CCCP" on their uniforms removed, leaving a blank spot. Rather than the Soviet national anthem, the Olympic Hymn was played, and the Olympic flag was used instead of the Soviet flag.

Many of the best Soviet players had since left the former Soviet Union for the National Hockey League (NHL), which did not stop play for the Olympics. Thus, the team used players from the Russian and Swiss leagues instead, and head coach Viktor Tikhonov, known for his authoritarian style of coaching, was forced to modify his strategy, as he had no leverage over the players. Despite the absence of superstars, the CIS team had no problems with talent, boasting experienced veterans Vyacheslav Bykov, Andrei Khomutov and Alexei Zhamnov. The team was composed almost entirely of Russians, with Lithuanian-born Darius Kasparaitis and Ukrainian-born Alexei Zhitnik the only non-Russians. Kasparaitis would later represent Russia in international competition. In 2017, he switched to join the Lithuanian national team. Zhitnik would represent Russia throughout his career.

They played in three friendlies against Austria, Canada, and Italy in January 1992. They defeated the Austrians and Canadians 7-2 each, and the Italians by a score of 4–2.

The national team next took part in the Nissan Cup, hosted by Switzerland. They defeated Finland in the semifinals 6–2, but were surprised by the Swiss hosts in the final, losing by a score of 3–0.

At the 1992 Winter Olympics held in Albertville, France, the national team finished with a 7–1 record, and won the gold medal by defeating Canada 3–1 in the final.

After the Olympics, the team was dissolved and replaced by the Russian national team and other national teams for the independent post-Soviet states.

Olympic record

Roster

A total of 20 skaters and 2 goalies players played for the Unified Team at the 1992 Winter Olympics. Nikolai Borschevsky and Andrei Khomutov tied for the lead in goals, with 7 each, while Khomutov and Vyacheslav Bykov had the most assists, 7. Khomutov had the most points on the team, with 14. While named to the team, Nikolai Khabibulin did not play in any games.

Skaters

Goaltenders

References

Former national ice hockey teams
Sport in the Commonwealth of Independent States
Unified Team at the Olympics